Moreno is a city in the state of Pernambuco, Brazil. It's integrated in the Recife metropolitan area with another 13 cities. Moreno has a total area of 195.6 square kilometers and had an estimated population of 63,294 inhabitants in 2020 according with IBGE.

Geography

 State - Pernambuco
 Region - RMR (Recife)
 Boundaries - São Lourenço da Mata (N), Cabo de Santo Agostinho (S), Jaboatão (W), Vitória de Santo Antão (E)
 Area - 195.6 km2
 Elevation - 96 m (312 ft)
 Hydrography - Capibaribe River
 Vegetation - Atlantic forest, capoeira, capoeirinha and sugarcane plantation
 Climate - Hot tropical and dry
 Annual average temperature - 26 C
 Main road -  BR 232 and PE 007
 Distance to Recife - 30 km

Economy

The main economic activities in Moreno are based in food industry, commerce and primary sector especially eggs, chickens and honey.

Economic Indicators

Economy by Sector
2006

Health Indicators

References

Municipalities in Pernambuco